is a Japanese racing driver. He currently competes in the GT500 class of the Super GT Series for TGR Team au TOM's, where he is the 2021 series champion. He also competes in the Super Formula Championship for Carenex Team Impul.

Career

Formula Renault
Sekiguchi competed in two races of the 2004 Asian Formula Renault Challenge for the Asia Racing Team, scoring no points.

Formula Toyota
Sekiguchi drove in the Japan-based Formula Toyota in 2005 and 2006, winning the drivers' championship in his second year in the series.

Formula Challenge Japan
Sekiguchi also competed in Formula Challenge Japan in 2006, winning the drivers' title in this championship in addition to his Toyota success.

All-Japan Formula Three
Sekiguchi moved up to the All-Japan Formula Three series for 2007, driving for the Now Motorsport team. He finished seventh overall in the points standings.

International Formula Master
Sekiguchi moved to Europe in 2008 to compete in the International Formula Master championship. He finished sixteenth in the points standings, with two fourth-placed finishes at Imola and Monza.

GP2 Series
In late 2008, Sekiguchi competed in the first round of the 2008–09 GP2 Asia Series season for the David Price Racing team.  His team-mate was Michael Herck. He was the fourth Japanese driver in the championship, alongside Sakon Yamamoto, Kamui Kobayashi, and Hiroki Yoshimoto. However, he was then replaced by Giacomo Ricci from the second round onwards.

Return to All-Japan Formula Three
Sekiguchi returned to the All-Japan Formula Three Championship for 2009, finishing fifth in the National class. He improved to finish as runner-up in 2010, and then won the championship in 2011.

Super GT (2007-)

GT300 (2007-2012) 
Sekiguchi made his Super GT debut in 2007, partnering 2002 GT500 champion Akira Iida. At round five at Sportsland SUGO, Sekiguchi drove from behind and passed Shigekazu Wakisaka with just a few laps remaining to take the win. Sekiguchi thus became the youngest GT300 class race winner in history, at 19 years, 7 months of age (a record which would be broken in 2008 by Keisuke Kunimoto).

After returning to Japan in 2009 he again juggled his All-Japan Formula Three Championship with a drive in the GT300 class of Super GT. He drove for Hironori Takeuchi's SHIFT team in 2009, and for JLOC Lamborghini for the 2010 and 2011 seasons, achieving a best result of 3rd, at Motegi in 2010.

After winning the All-Japan Formula 3 Championship in 2011, and after a solid performance in that year's Macau Grand Prix, Sekiguchi joined NDDP (Nissan Driver Development Programme) Racing in 2012, driving their new Nissan GT-R NISMO GT3 alongside newcomer Katsumasa Chiyo. That season, they won from pole position at the fourth round of the season at SUGO, and added a second place at that year's Suzuka 1000km. But Sekiguchi was also forced to sit out the sixth round of the championship at Fuji Speedway due to multiple violations of Super GT's Driving Moral Hazard System.

GT500 (2013-) 
Sekiguchi made his debut in the GT500 class for the 2013 season, joining the defending series champions MOLA and partnering 3-time series champion Satoshi Motoyama. They took pole position for the fourth round at Sugo, with Sekiguchi leading during his stint of the race. In a chaotic final laps of the race, they were ultimately relegated to seventh place. Their best finish that year was fourth at Autopolis.

For 2014, Sekiguchi made the surprising switch to drive for Lexus, and joined Lexus Team WedsSport BANDOH alongside another three-time GT500 champion, Juichi Wakisaka. They finished the season on a high with two sixth-place finishes at Buriram United International Circuit, and Twin Ring Motegi, to close out the season. Their second year together saw great improvements, with Sekiguchi and Wakisaka finishing every race in the points in 2015, highlighted by a fourth-place finish at the Suzuka 1000 km.

Wakisaka announced his retirement from Super GT racing in February 2016, and Sekiguchi was joined by Yuji Kunimoto in the WedsSport RC-F. Once again, Sekiguchi had a strong race at Sugo, battling Heikki Kovalainen for the lead of the race for several laps before ultimately finishing fifth.

At the sixth race of the year in Buriram, Sekiguchi scored his first pole position lap, and went on to take his first GT500 race win - and the first GT500 victory for Racing Project Bandoh after six years in the top class. Sekiguchi and Kunimoto finished third in the final race of the season at Motegi, to finish the year fourth in the standings, career bests for both drivers and their team. They once again scored points in every race of the season.

As of the conclusion of the 2016 season, Sekiguchi holds the longest active streak of consecutive points-paying finishes in Super GT with eighteen races. The current record is held by Takeshi Tsuchiya, who recorded 33 consecutive points-paying finishes from 2002 to 2006.

Sekiguchi won the 2021 Super GT championship in the GT500 class, in the TGR Team au TOM'S Toyota Supra GT500 alongside Sho Tsuboi; the team overcame a 16-point deficit in the final round of the season at Fuji. However, the event was marred by controversy as the championship-leading Team Kunimitsu car of Naoki Yamamoto was taken out from a title-clinching position in an accident caused by GT300 class driver Ren Sato.

Super Formula (2016-) 
After spending twelve seasons between the Japanese single-seater ladder and Super GT, Sekiguchi was finally offered the chance to race in the Super Formula championship in 2016 for Team Impul. He joined McLaren Honda F1 reserve driver Stoffel Vandoorne as one of only two rookies on the grid that season.

In his first Super Formula start at Suzuka, he qualified third on the grid, ahead of Vandoorne, reigning Super Formula champion Kazuki Nakajima and his TOM's teammate Andre Lotterer, and Kamui Kobayashi. After two non-scoring races, Sekiguchi finally scored his first podium at Fuji Speedway, then at the following race at Motegi, he won in just his fourth career start, making him only the third Super Formula rookie without any prior experience in Formula 1 to win a race in the 21st century.

Sekiguchi won his second race of the year at Sugo. After leading the first 19 laps and building up a sizeable lead, he was left as the only car yet to pit for fuel following a safety car intervention. He then proceeded to drive more than a second per lap faster than the field for the next 32 laps to extend his lead to over 35 seconds before pitting, and re-emerged from the pits without relinquishing the lead of the race. He finished the season third in the final standings, ahead of the Formula 1-bound Vandoorne.

The driver continued with Team Impul in the 2017 Super Formula Championship. He won at Okayama race 2 and finished second at Okayama race 1.

Racing record

Career summary

 † - As Sekiguchi was a guest driver, he was ineligible for points.

Complete Super GT results
(key) (Races in bold indicate pole position) (Races in italics indicate fastest lap)

* Season still in progress.

Complete Super Formula results
(Races in bold indicate pole position)

* Season still in progress.

References

External links
Official website - Japanese
Yuhi Sekiguchi career details at driverdb.com

1987 births
People from Nakano, Tokyo
Living people
Japanese racing drivers
Asian Formula Renault Challenge drivers
Super GT drivers
Super Formula drivers
Japanese Formula 3 Championship drivers
International Formula Master drivers
GP2 Asia Series drivers
Formula Challenge Japan drivers
Asia Racing Team drivers
Euronova Racing drivers
David Price Racing drivers
Mücke Motorsport drivers
TOM'S drivers
Toyota Gazoo Racing drivers
Asian Le Mans Series drivers
B-Max Racing drivers